"I'm Beggin' You" is a 1987 single by British progressive rock band Supertramp and one of two entries into the dance charts by Supertramp. "I'm Beggin' You" reached number one on the U.S. Billboard Hot Dance Club Play for one week, early in 1988. Unlike previous entries the single did not enter the Billboard Hot 100.

Music video
The music video for "I'm Beggin' You" was directed by Zbigniew Rybczyński. The video was set in New York City. Appearing were the George Washington Bridge, Times Square, and at the end of the music video, the Brooklyn Bridge spanning the East River.

Track listing
 "I'm Beggin' You" (Rick Davies)
 "No Inbetween" (Davies)

Personnel
Rick Davies – piano, keyboards, vocals
Marty Walsh – guitar
Dougie Thomson – bass guitar
John Helliwell – saxophone, brass
Lee Thornburg – trumpet, brass
Nick Lane – brass
Scott Page – brass
Lon Price – brass
David Woodford – brass
Bob Siebenberg – drums

Charts

References

1987 singles
Supertramp songs
Songs written by Rick Davies
1987 songs
A&M Records singles